Sujinda Dangvan (born 20 October 1991), or simply known as Billy, is a Thai-American former professional footballer who played as a defensive midfielder.

External links

Sujinda Dangvan
1991 births
Living people
Sujinda Dangvan
Sujinda Dangvan
Association football midfielders
Soccer players from San Diego
Thai expatriate sportspeople in the United States